Varian Johnson (born in 1977) is an American writer, who writes contemporary middle grade literature. He is the author of multiple novels including My Life as a Rhombus.

Biography
Johnson is a twin and the father of two daughters. He is also a member of The Brown Bookshelf, an organization that "is designed to push awareness of the myriad of African American voices writing for young authors".

Published works
 A Red Polka Dot in a World Full of Plaid (2005)
 Essence best seller list, March 2005
 My Life as a Rhombus (2008)
 Saving Maddie (2010)
 Bank Street Best Children's Book, 2011
 Open Mic: Riffs on Life Between Cultures in Ten Voices (2013), contributor
 Things I'll Never Say: Stories About Our Secret Selves (2015), contributor
 Been There, Done That: School Dazed (2016), contributor
 The Great Greene Heist (2014)
 Kirkus Reviews Best Book, 2014
 ALA ALSC Notable Children's Books List, 2015
 Bank Street Best Children's Book, 2015
 To Catch a Cheat (A Jackson Greene Novel) (2016)
 The Return (2016), Spirit Animals: Fall of the Beasts book 3
 The Wildcat's Claw (2017), Spirit Animals: Fall of the Beasts book 6
 Gabriela: Time for Change (2017), American Girl: Girl of the Year 2017 book 3
 The Parker Inheritance (2018)
 What Were The Negro Leagues? (2019) a Who HQ series book, Penguin Workshop
Twins (2020)
 Playing the Cards You’re Dealt (2021)
Mister Miracle: The Great Escape (2022)

References

External links
 

Living people
1977 births
American male writers